PUBLIC RELATIONS is a Czech rock band, which was formed in 2004. Despite originally playing crossover, over time they have moved on to electronic rock, fusing the common rock elements with an electronic instrumentation.

History 
Many musicians had been turning in the band until 2008 when its line-up finally settled down in its permanent form: Jiří Sosik – guitar, Tomáš Frieb – guitar, Tomáš Klos – bass, Lukáš Kroutil – drums, Lukáš Kraut – vocals.

In 2008 the group recorded its debut album called "No Turns"  and started performing live in clubs and on music festivals, enhanced by a percussionist Tomáš Demel. The drummer Lukáš Kroutil left the band the next year and his place was filled by Marek Konečný, who had just come back from the US, where he had been playing drums in a band called Cold Summer Society, after 13 years. Later, the band continued performing, however, without Tomáš Demel, who decided not to perform with PUBLIC RELATIONS henceforward.

Those days the band had been working hard on new material, which culminated in 2011 by releasing its second album called "The Platinum Air". After its release party and a series of live shows, the band was taking pause and Lukáš Kraut started working on his solo material. In July 2012 – the 8th anniversary of the band's existence – the vocalist decided to devote himself only to his solo career and left the band. The guitarist Tomáš Frieb left PUBLIC RELATIONS with him.

In the beginning of 2013 the band found a replacement for the position of the frontman – the vocalist Jan Ražnok, who had been performing in many local bands and projects before. With their new singer, PUBLIC RELATIONS prepared a new repertoire, which was released on their third studio album on 31 December 2013.

The Sirael album 
In 2016, PUBLIC RELATIONS released a concept album named "Sirael". On this record, the band presented a story of an artificial woman, set in a post-apocalyptic future where machines took over the world. For the first time on a PUBLIC RELATIONS album, most of the lyrics were written in Czech. Two songs from Sirael – Hora and Naděje – got accompanied by thematic music videos. A Czech rock chart "Břitva" listed the record on 67th place in 2016.

Present 
In 2019, PUBLIC RELATIONS started working on a new album. However, in the middle of the recording process, the vocalist Jan Ražnok announced his decision to leave the band. Nevertheless, they agreed on finishing the record together while looking for a new singer. That position was taken by Přemysl Weber, who performed with PUBLIC RELATIONS for the first time on 28 December 2019. The last album featuring Jan  "Comar" Ražnok as one of the authors and a vocalist of the band was titled "Překonej svůj strach", and released on 2 February 2020. After six months, Přemysl Weber decided to leave the band. His place was taken by David Tobi Tobiasz, a former lead vocalist of groups Robson and Jeseter.

With this line-up, PUBLIC RELATIONS recorded the album Naděje during 2021. It was released on 1 May 2022, and consisted of 12 new versions of songs from the band’s previous three records. For the first time in the history of the band, all lyrics on the album were sung in Czech.

Current lineup 
 David Tobi Tobiasz – vocals 
 Jiří Sosik – guitar 
 Tomáš Klos – bass 
 Marek Konečný – drums

Discography 
 No Turns, 2008
 The Platinum Air, 2011
 Close To Sun (EP), 2013
 Reset, 2013
 Sirael, 2016
 Překonej svůj strach, 2020
 Naděje, 2022

References

External links

Sources 
 Czech Wikipedia 

Czech rock music groups
Musical groups established in 2004
2004 establishments in the Czech Republic